Słup Lake is a retention reservoir located on the channel of the Raging Neisse river, located in the Sudeten Upland (Podgórze Sudeckie) in the Lower Silesian Voivodeship; 1 km to the north-west of the city of Jawor. It was finished in 1978.

References

Lakes of Poland
1978 establishments in Poland